The following are people either born, raised, or have lived for a significant period of time in the U.S. state of Arizona and/or the Arizona Territory.

Academia
Russell Merle Genet – research scholar and astronomer
Joseph Hilbe (1944–2017) – statistician, professor, and author
Craig D. Idso – founder and chairman of the board of the Center for the Study of Carbon Dioxide and Global Change
Percival Lowell (1855–1916) – astronomer and founder of the Lowell Observatory
Julia Robinson – mathematician
Larry T. Wimmer – professor of economics
Roger L. Worsley – educator

Art, literature, and poetry

Art 
Max Cannon (born 1962) – alternative cartoonist
Bil Keane (1922–2011) – cartoonist
James Rallison (born 1996) – cartoonist and YouTuber
Paolo Soleri (1919–2013) – architect

Literature
Clive Cussler (1931–2020) – author of the Dirk Pitt adventure novels and shipwreck explorer, part-time resident
Diana Gabaldon (born 1952) – novelist
Kevin Hearne (born 1970) – novelist
Harold L. Humes (1926–1992) – novelist, co-founder of The Paris Review
Stephenie Meyer (born 1973) – author, teen literature novelist, Twilight series
Barbara Park (1947–2013) – author of the Junie B. Jones series
Barrett Tillman (born 1948) – novelist and military historian
Brady Udall (born 1971) – author
Mary Whitebird (died 2010) – author

Poetry
Ai (1947–2010) – poet and educator
Jon Anderson (1940–2007) – poet and educator
Jayne Cortez (1934–2012) – poet, activist, small press publisher and spoken-word performance artist
Norman Dubie (born 1945) – poet, educator, Regents Professor of English at Arizona State University
Alberto Ríos (born 1952) – poet, author, Arizona's first state poet laureate, Regents Professor and Katharine C. Turner Endowed Chair in English at Arizona State University 
Richard Shelton (born 1933) – poet, writer, and emeritus Regents Professor of English at the University of Arizona
Jim Simmerman (1952–2006) – poet and editor
Luci Tapahonso (born 1953) – poet and educator
Ofelia Zepeda (born 1952) – poet and educator

Film, television, and theater

Erika Alexander (born 1969) – actress
Rex Allen (1920–1999) – actor, iconic singing cowboy
Steve Allen (1921–2000) – comedian, actor, known as the "father of TV talk shows"; first job was in Arizona
Asher Angel (born 2002) – actor, Shazam!
Samaire Armstrong (born 1980) – actress, Juliet Darling on Dirty Sexy Money and Anna Stern on The O.C.
Jules Asner (born 1968) – actress and host of E!'s show Wild On!
Jaime Lyn Bauer (born 1949) – soap opera actress, played Lauralee Brooks on The Young and the Restless and Laura Spencer Horton on Days of Our Lives
Sandra Bernhard (born 1955) – actress, comedian; attended high school in Arizona
Michael Biehn (born 1956) – actor, The Terminator, Tombstone
Mika Boorem (born 1987) – actress, The Tom Show
Aidy Bryant (born 1987) – actress, comedian, Saturday Night Live
Brooke Burke (born 1971) – actress, model, TV personality, Dancing with the Stars
Jordan Capri (born 1984) – model
Lynda Carter (born 1951) – actress and singer, known for Wonder Woman, 1972 Miss World USA
Joan Ganz Cooney (born 1929) – TV producer of Sesame Street
Brady Corbet (born 1988) – actor
J'aime Crandall (born 1982) – ballet dancer
Matt Dallas (born 1982) – actor, Kyle XY
Ted Danson (born 1947) – actor, Cheers, CSI
Rosemary DeCamp (1910–2001) – actress, Yankee Doodle Dandy, The Bob Cummings Show
Andy Devine (1905–1977) – actor, Stagecoach, The Man Who Shot Liberty Valance
Charles Dudley (1883–1952) – stage and film actor, studio makeup artist
Barbara Eden (born 1931) – actress, I Dream of Jeannie
Gail Edwards (born 1952) – actress, known for her roles in It's a Living, Blossom, and Full House
Jack Elam (1918–2003) – actor
Michael Ensign (born 1944) – actor, Boston Legal
Danielle Fishel (born 1981) – actress, Boy Meets World and Girl Meets World 
Pablo Francisco (born 1974) – stand-up comedian, actor
Sammi Hanratty (born 1995) – child actress, The Unit, The Suite Life of Zack & Cody
Alexa Havins (born 1980) – actress, All My Children, One Life to Live, Torchwood
Amelia Heinle (born 1973) – actress, Victoria Newman on The Young and the Restless; also played Mia Saunders on All My Children
David Henrie (born 1989) – actor, Wizards of Waverly Place, How I Met Your Mother, That's So Raven
Catherine Hicks (born 1951) – actress, 7th Heaven, Child's Play; attended Gerard Catholic High School
Earl Hindman (1942–2003) – actor, Ryan's Hope, Home Improvement
Gregg Hoffman (1963–2005) – film producer
Michael Horse (born 1951) – artist, actor, Twin Peaks, Passenger 57
Dominic Janes (born 1994) – teen actor, ER, Out of Jimmy's Head, Dexter
Brad Johnson (born 1959) – actor, Always, Flight of the Intruder
Chelsea Kane (born 1988) – actress, singer, Jonas, Fish Hooks
Tanner Maguire (born 1998) – child actor, Young Shawn Brady on Days of Our Lives
Leslie Mancia (born 1987) – model, contestant on America’s Next Top Model Cycle 6 
Taryn Manning (born 1978) – actress, fashion designer, singer-songwriter
Abigail Mavity (born 1993) – actress
Josh McDermitt (born 1978) – actor, comedian, Dr. Eugene Porter on The Walking Dead
Rachel Melvin (born 1985) – actress, Chelsea Brady on Days of Our Lives
Jenny Mollen (born 1979) – actress
Heather Morris (born 1987) – actress, Brittany Pierce on Glee
Tarah Paige (born 1982) – actress, dancer, gymnast, Make It or Break It
Mary-Louise Parker (born 1964) – actress, Weeds; graduated from Marcos de Niza High School, Tempe
Valerie Perrine (born 1943) – actress, Superman, Lenny; attended Camelback High School
Busy Philipps (born 1979) – actress, Cougar Town, Dawson's Creek, Freaks and Geeks
Larry Pine (born 1945) – actor
Greg Proops (born 1959) – actor, comedian
Jenni Pulos – Jeff Lewis's assistant on Bravo's Flipping Out
 James Rallison (born 1996) – internet personality, animator
Liz Renay (1926–2007) – actress
Terry Rhoads (1951–2013) – actor
Jennifer Rubin (born 1962) – actress, model
Jayla Rubinelli (born 1984) – model, contestant on America’s Next Top Model Cycle 5
Kylee Saunders (born 1994) – Japanese-American singer
Garry Shandling (1949–2016) – actor, comedian, The Larry Sanders Show
David Spade (born 1965) – actor, comedian, Saturday Night Live, Tommy Boy, Just Shoot Me
Fay Spain (1932–1983) – actress, The Godfather Part II, Al Capone, God's Little Acre
Emma Stone (born 1988) – actress, La La Land, The Help, The Amazing Spider-Man
Shayne Topp (born 1991) – internet personality, comedian, actor, Smosh, The Goldbergs
Amber Valletta (born 1974) – actress, model
Janet Varney (born 1976) – actress, On the Lot, The Legend of Korra, Stan Against Evil
Kate Walsh (born 1967) – actress, Dr. Addison Montgomery on Grey's Anatomy and Private Practice
Mare Winningham (born 1959) – actress, American Horror Story, St. Elmo's Fire, Georgia
Scott William Winters (born 1965) – actor, Oz, NYPD Blue
Shannon Woodward (born 1984) – actress, Westworld, Raising Hope, The Riches
Jason Zumwalt (born 1975) – actor, scriptwriter, voice of Roman in Grand Theft Auto IV

Government, law, and politics

Thad Allen (born 1949) – retired U.S. Coast Guard admiral; National Incident Commander under President Barack Obama
Joe Arpaio (born 1932) – former Maricopa County Sheriff (1993–2016)
Henry F. Ashurst (1874–1962) – one of the first U.S. Senators from Arizona (1912–1941)
John T. Alsap (1830–1886) – first Mayor of Phoenix
Bruce Babbitt (born 1938) – former Governor of Arizona (1978–1987), and Secretary of the Interior in the Clinton Administration (1993–2001)
Harriet C. Babbitt (born 1947) – First Lady of Arizona (1978–1987), U.S. Ambassador to the Organization of American States (1993–1997), and Deputy Administrator of the U.S. Agency for International Development (1997–2001) 
Walter Blackman – Republican member of the Arizona House of Representatives 
Jan Brewer (born 1944) – served as the 22nd Governor of Arizona
William Docker Browning (1931–2008) – federal judge
Dean Burch – former chairman of the Republican National Committee
César Chávez (1927–1993) – labor union leader
Dennis DeConcini (born 1937) – retired U.S. Senator (1977–1994)
Doug Ducey (born 1964) – Governor of Arizona (2015–2023)
Paul Fannin (1907–2002) – former U.S. Senator (1965–1977) and Governor of Arizona (1959–1965)
Jeff Flake (born 1962) – Arizona U.S. Senator (2013–2019)
Gabby Giffords (born 1970) – U.S. Representative, wounded in the 2011 Tucson shooting
Barry M. Goldwater (1909–1998) – longtime Arizona Senator (1953–1965, 1969–1987), and 1964 Republican nominee for president
George Nicholas Goodman (1895–1959) – five-time mayor of Mesa in three different decades.
John Noble Goodwin (1824–1887) – first Governor of the Arizona Territory (1863–1866)
Margaret Hance (1923–1990) – first female Mayor of Phoenix from 1976 to 1983
Carl Hayden (1877–1972) – U.S. Senator, holds the record for the longest service in the U.S. Congress
Katie Hobbs (born 1969) - incumbent Secretary of State of Arizona since 2019, current Governor-elect of Arizona
 Brad Hoylman (born 1965) - New York State Senator
Don Lorenzo Hubbell – Arizona State Senator
John C. Keegan – judge, legislator, Mayor of Peoria
Lisa Graham Keegan – legislator, Superintendent of Public Instruction
Denison Kitchel (1908–2002) – Scottsdale lawyer and the Goldwater presidential national campaign manager in 1964 
Jon Kyl (born 1942) – former U.S. Senator (1995–2013; 2018–)
Fiorello La Guardia – Mayor of New York City
Rex E. Lee (1935–1996) – United States Solicitor General during the Reagan Administration
John McCain (1936–2018) – Panamanian-born politician, longtime U.S. Senator from Arizona from 1986 until his death, former navy officer, and 2008 Republican nominee for president
Ernest McFarland (1894–1984) – former U.S. Senator (1941–1953) and Governor of Arizona (1955–1959)
Rose Mofford (1922–2016) – first female Governor of Arizona from 1988 to 1991
Janet Napolitano (born 1957) – served as the 21st Governor of Arizona
Sandra Day O'Connor (born 1930) – first female justice of the United States Supreme Court
Mary Peters (born 1948) – United States Secretary of Transportation under President George W. Bush
Ben Quayle (born 1976) – former U.S. Congressman
Dan Quayle (born 1947) – former U.S. Senator from Indiana (1981–1989), and 44th Vice President of the United States under George H. W. Bush
William Rehnquist (1924–2005) – Chief Justice of the Supreme Court
 Charles S. Robb (born 1939) – former Governor of Virginia (1982–1986) and U.S. Senator from Virginia (1989–2001)
John Shadegg (born 1949) – former U.S. representative from Phoenix
Stephen Shadegg (1909–1990) – political consultant associated with Barry Goldwater
Marcus A. Smith (1851–1924) – one of the first two Senators from Arizona
John G.F. Speiden (1900–1970) – rancher and political insider, various state boards
Jack Taylor – mayor of Mesa from 1966 to 1972; member of both houses, consecutively, of the Arizona legislature
David King Udall – Arizona Territorial Legislature
Don Taylor Udall – Arizona State Legislature
Jesse Addison Udall – Chief Justice of the Arizona Supreme Court
John Hunt Udall – Mayor of Phoenix
Levi Stewart Udall – Chief Justice of the Arizona Supreme Court
Mark Udall – Senator from Colorado
Morris "Mo" Udall (1922–1998) – U.S. Congressman and former pro basketball player
Nick Udall – Mayor of Phoenix
Stewart Udall (1920–2010) – U.S. Congressman and Secretary of the Interior during the JFK and LBJ administrations

Journalism and media
Rachel Campos-Duffy (born 1971) – TV personality, The Real World: San Francisco, The View
Cheryl Casone (born 1970) – anchor for the Fox Business Network and business correspondent for Fox News
John Garcia – National Geographic Channel's DogTown series star, Guinness World Record holder
Hadas Gold (born 1988) – media and business reporter 
Savannah Guthrie (born 1971) – White House correspondent for NBC News, co-host of NBC's Today Show
Dan Hicks (born 1962) – sportscaster for NBC
Pat Hughes (born 1955) – play-by-play voice of the Chicago Cubs for WGN radio
Don Imus (1940–2019) – nationally syndicated talk radio host, Imus in the Morning
Meghan McCain (born 1984) – co-host of The View
Noah Beck (born 2001) – Social media personality

Military

John Dean "Jeff" Cooper (1920–2006) – World War II United States Marine Corps officer and firearms training innovator
Timothy Creamer (born 1959) – U.S. Army Colonel, NASA astronaut
Joe Foss (1915–2003) – leading United States Marine Corps fighter ace and Medal of Honor recipient
Ira Hayes (1923–1955) – United States Marine Corps, World War II, helped raise United States flag during the Battle of Iwo Jima
Frank Luke (1897–1918) – World War I fighter pilot, Medal of Honor recipient
Lori Piestewa (1979–2003) – United States Army, first Native American woman from Arizona to be killed in war; Iraq War, Purple Heart and Prisoner of War Medal recipient
Pat Tillman (1976–2004) – United States Army; Afghanistan Silver Star recipient; college and NFL football player

Musicians

Jim Adkins (born 1975) – lead singer and guitarist for the band Jimmy Eat World
Rex Allen (1920–1999) – singer-songwriter, actor, known as "The Arizona Cowboy"
Alec Benjamin (born 1994) – pop singer
Chester Bennington (1976–2017) – lead singer for the band Linkin Park
Dierks Bentley (born 1975) – country singer (Phoenix)
Derrick Bostrom (born 1960) – Meat Puppets drummer
Jess Bowen (born 1989) – alternative rock musician, drummer of The Summer Set
Michelle Branch (born 1983) – singer-songwriter, guitarist
Kennedy Brock (born 1989) – alternative rock musician, guitarist of The Maine
Glen Campbell (1936–2017) – singer, musician and actor; inductee to Country Music Hall of Fame
Max Cavalera (born 1969) – vocalist and guitarist (Sepultura, Soulfly, Cavalera conspiracy)
Roger Clyne (born 1968) – rock musician; lead singer for Refreshments and RCPM
Alice Cooper (born 1948) – rock and roll singer
Brian Dales (born 1989) – alternative rock musician, lead singer of The Summer Set
Duane Eddy (born 1938) – guitarist, inductee of Rock and Roll Hall of Fame
Linda Eder (born 1961) – singer, Broadway star and recording artist
Travis Edmonson (1932–2009) – singer-songwriter, part of folk duo Bud & Travis
David Ellefson (born 1964) – bass guitar player and co-founder of the metal band Megadeth
Dolan Ellis (born 1935) – singer-songwriter, official State Balladeer since 1966, original member of New Christy Minstrels
Esteban (born 1948) – musician
Frank Fafara – early 1960s pop singer, TV star of Wallace & Ladmo Show
Steve George (born 1955) – of the group Mr. Mister
John Gomez (born 1991) – alternative rock musician, guitarist of The Summer Set
Stephen Gomez (born 1988) – alternative rock musician, bassist of The Summer Set
Lalo Guerrero (1916–2005) – singer-songwriter, known as the "father of Chicano music"; recipient of the National Medal of Arts
Injury Reserve – alternative and experimental rap group consisting of producer Parker Corey and rappers Nathaniel Ritchie and Jordan Groggs (1988–2020)
Waylon Jennings (1937–2002) – singer; inductee to Country Music Hall of Fame
Joe Jonas (born 1989) – member of the Jonas Brothers and lead singer of the pop-rock band DNCE
Daniel Jones – guitarist and vocalist with 7th Order
Maynard James Keenan (born 1964) – actor, frontman for Tool, A Perfect Circle, and Puscifer
Brandon Kellum (born 1985) – frontman for American Standards
Patrick Kirch (born 1990) – alternative rock musician, drummer of The Maine
Cris Kirkwood (born 1960) – guitar and vocals for the Meat Puppets
Katie Lee (1919–2017) – folk singer
Craig Mabbitt (born 1987) – frontman for Blessthefall (2003-2008), The Word Alive (2008), and Escape the Fate (2008–present)
Charles Mingus (1922–1979) – jazz bassist, composer and bandleader
Josh Montgomery (born 1988) – alternative rock musician, guitarist of The Summer Set
Dave Mustaine (born 1961) – frontman and founder of the metal band Megadeth
Jason Newsted (born 1963) – former bassist of heavy metal band Metallica
Wayne Newton (born 1942) – singer, known as "Mr. Las Vegas"
Stevie Nicks (born 1948) – Grammy-winning singer-songwriter, known for solo work and as lead singer with Fleetwood Mac
Hans Olson (born 1952) – musician, singer and songwriter; inducted into the Arizona Blues Hall of Fame
Buck Owens (1929–2006) – country singer and musician; inductee to the Country Music Hall of Fame (Mesa)
Richard Page (born 1953) – of the group Mr. Mister
CeCe Peniston (born 1969) – pop singer
Marty Robbins (1925–1982) – country music singer
Linda Ronstadt (born 1946) – singer-songwriter, 2014 Rock and Roll Hall of Fame inductee
Nate Ruess (born 1982) – lead singer of Fun. and formerly of The Format
Alvie Self – 1960s musician and singer
Bob Shane (1934–2020) – singer, founding member of The Kingston Trio
Jordin Sparks (born 1989) – singer, winner of American Idol Season 6
Chris Squire (1948–2015) – bass player and founding member of progressive rock group Yes
Tanya Tucker (born 1958) – country singer
Upsahl (born 1998) – indie pop singer
Brooke White (born 1983) – indie pop, folk-pop singer

Old West era

Apache Kid (1860–1896?) – outlaw, reported killer of three Arizona lawmen 1889–1890
Billy the Kid (1859–1881) – outlaw
William Brocius (1845–1882) – gunman, rustler, outlaw Cowboy
Cochise (1812–1874) – chief of the Chiricahua Apache
Wyatt Earp (1848–1929) – lawman
Virgil Earp (1843–1905) – lawman
C. S. Fly (1849–1901) – photographer
Geronimo (1829–1909) – leader of Chiricahua Apache who fought against encroachment of European settlers on Native American lands; hero of Native American fight for respect and independence
Pearl Hart (1871–1955) – outlaw
Doc Holliday (1851–1887) – gambler, gunfighter, dentist
Irataba (1814–1874) – leader of the Mohave Nation
Imogen LaChance (1853-1938) – social reformer 
Bat Masterson (1853–1921) – lawman, gambler, journalist
Sherman McMaster (1853–1892) – outlaw turned lawman, involved in Earp Vendetta Ride
James Reavis (1843–1914) – self-styled "Baron of Arizona", claimed to have owned much of Arizona
Johnny Ringo (1850–1882) – outlaw
John Horton Slaughter (1841–1922) – lawman, cowboy, poker player, rancher
Billy Stiles (1871–1908) – outlaw

Sportspeople

Auston Matthews (born 1997) – center for the Toronto Maple Leafs
Max Aaron (born 1992) – 2013 U.S. national champion figure skater
Chance Adams (born 1994) – starting pitcher for the New York Yankees
Jeremy Affeldt (born 1979) – relief pitcher for the San Francisco Giants
Erik Affholter (born 1966) – NFL wide receiver
Kyle Allen (born 1996) – NFL quarterback
Prince Amukamara (born 1989) – cornerback for the New York Giants
Brian Anderson (born 1982) – outfielder for the Kansas City Royals
Mark Andrews (born 1996) – NFL tight end
Jake Bailey (born 1997) – punter for the New England Patriots
Dave Baldwin (born 1938) – Major League Baseball player
Brian Bannister (born 1981) – starting pitcher for the Kansas City Royals
Jake Barrett (born 1991) – relief pitcher for the Arizona Diamondbacks
Danny Batten (born 1987) – linebacker for the Buffalo Bills
Jerryd Bayless (born 1988) – player for the Toronto Raptors
John Beck (born 1981) – quarterback for the Washington Redskins
Rich Beem (born 1970) – professional golfer
Charlie Beljan (born 1984) – professional golfer
Mike Bell (born 1983) – running back for the New Orleans Saints
Cody Bellinger (born 1995) – first baseman and outfielder for the Los Angeles Dodgers
Mike Bibby (born 1978) – retired NBA point guard
Hunter Bishop (born 1998) - baseball player
Eddie Bonine (born 1981) – relief pitcher for the Detroit Tigers
Alex Bowman (born 1993) – NASCAR driver
Dallas Braden (born 1983) – starting pitcher for the Oakland A's
Debbie Bramwell-Washington (born 1966) – IFBB professional bodybuilder
Brian Broderick (born 1986) – pitcher for the Sugar Land Skeeters
Keith Brown (born 1964) – pitcher for the Cincinnati Reds
Mike Budenholzer (born 1964) – head coach for the Atlanta Hawks
Kole Calhoun (born 1987) – outfielder for the Los Angeles Angels
Michael Carbajal (born 1967) – boxing champion
Ka'Deem Carey (born 1992) – running back for the Chicago Bears
D. J. Carrasco (born 1977) – MLB pitcher
Henry Cejudo (born 1987) – 2008 Beijing Olympics gold medal winner in wrestling, UFC Flyweight Champion and Bantamweight Champion
Steve Colter (born 1962) – retired NBA point guard
Manuel Contreras (born 1993) – left fielder for the Arizona Diamondbacks
Bryce Cotton (born 1992) – point guard for the San Antonio Spurs
C. J. Cron (born 1990) – first baseman and designated hitter for the Minnesota Twins 
Curley Culp (1946–2021) – NFL defensive lineman, member of the Pro Football Hall of Fame
Billy Cundiff (born 1980) – placekicker for the Baltimore Ravens
Chad Curtis (born 1968) – MLB outfielder
Ike Davis (born 1987) – first baseman for the Oakland A's
Khris Davis (born 1987) – left fielder for the Oakland A's
Tyeler Davison (born 1992) – defensive tackle for the New Orleans Saints
Chris DeGeare (born 1987) – offensive guard for the Minnesota Vikings
Na'il Diggs (born 1978) – retired NFL linebacker
Chris Duncan (1981–2019) – left fielder and first baseman for the St. Louis Cardinals
Shelley Duncan (born 1979) – former MLB left fielder
Karl Eller (1928–2019) – owner of the Phoenix Suns
Sean Elliott (born 1968) – basketball player
Brady Ellison (born 1988) – competitive archer, World Champion and Olympian
Andre Ethier (born 1982) – outfielder for the Los Angeles Dodgers
Nick Evans (born 1986) – player for the Tohoku Rakuten Golden Eagles
Jeff Feagles (born 1966) – NFL punter
Carrick Felix (born 1990) – player for the Utah Jazz
Ryan Fitzpatrick (born 1982) – NFL quarterback for the Miami Dolphins
D. J. Foster (born 1993) – NFL running back for the New England Patriots
Channing Frye (born 1983) – center and power forward for the Phoenix Suns
Brianna & Nicole Garcia (born 1983) – professional wrestling twins, WWE from 2007 to 2012
Luis Fernando González Hoenig (born 1995), baseball outfielder for the San Francisco Giants
David Gossett (born 1979) – professional golfer
 Jim Grabb (born 1964) – tennis player ranked World No. 1 in doubles
Superstar Billy Graham (born 1943) – professional wrestler
Everson Griffen (born 1987) – defensive end for the Minnesota Vikings
Eric Hagg (born 1989) – safety for the Cleveland Browns
Scott Hairston (born 1980) – left fielder for the San Diego Padres
Max Hall (born 1985) – quarterback for the Arizona Cardinals
J. J. Hardy (born 1982) – shortstop for the Baltimore Orioles
Billy Hatcher (born 1960) – MLB player and coach
Mickey Hatcher (born 1955) – MLB player and coach
Todd Heap (born 1980) – tight end for the Baltimore Ravens
Charlie Hickcox (1947–2010) – competitive swimmer, three-time Olympic Champion
Austin Hollins (born 1991) - basketball player for Maccabi Tel Aviv of the Israeli Basketball Premier League 
Misty Hyman (born 1979) – 2000 Olympics gold medalist swimmer
Richie Incognito (born 1983) – guard for the Buffalo Bills
Helen Jacobs (1908–1997) – tennis player, member of International Tennis Hall of Fame
Robert James (born 1983) – linebacker for the Atlanta Falcons
J. J. Jansen (born 1986) – long snapper for the Carolina Panthers
Richard Jefferson (born 1980) – small forward for the Dallas Mavericks
Brian Jennings (born 1976) – long snapper and tight end for the San Francisco 49ers
Elliot Johnson (born 1984) – utility player for the Cleveland Indians
Nick Johnson (born 1992) – player for the Houston Rockets
Julie Ertz (born 1992) – defender for the United States women's national soccer team and Chicago Red Stars
Levi Jones (born 1979) – offensive tackle for the Washington Redskins
Cameron Jordan (born 1989) – defensive end for the New Orleans Saints
Ryan Kalil (born 1985) – center for the Carolina Panthers
Devon Kennard (born 1991) – linebacker for the New York Giants
Steve Kerr (born 1965) – head coach of the Golden State Warriors
Scott Kingery (born 1994) – baseball player for the Philadelphia Phillies
Ian Kinsler (born 1982) – Israeli-American 4-time All Star second baseman in Major League Baseball, Olympian
Paul Konerko (born 1976) – first baseman for the Chicago White Sox
Kyle Kosier (born 1978) – guard for the Dallas Cowboys
Rick Kranitz (born 1958) – pitching coach for the Atlanta Braves
Frank Kush (1929–2017) – head football coach for Arizona State and NFL's Baltimore Colts
Spencer Larsen (born 1984) – NFL fullback
Jon Levine (born 1963) – tennis player
Kevin Long (born 1966) – hitting coach for the New York Mets
Lou Marson (born 1986) – catcher for the Cleveland Indians
Doug Mathis (born 1983) – relief pitcher for the Texas Rangers
Billy Mayfair (born 1966) – professional golfer
Mickey McConnell (born 1989) – player for the Texas Legends
Randall McDaniel (born 1964) – NFL offensive guard; member of both the College and Pro Football Hall of Fame 
Michael McDowell (born 1984) – NASCAR driver
Phil Mickelson (born 1970) – professional golfer
Zach Miller (born 1985) – tight end for the Seattle Seahawks
Brad Mills (born 1985) – relief pitcher for the Toronto Blue Jays
Bryce Molder (born 1979) – professional golfer
Arte Moreno (born 1946) – owner of the Los Angeles Angels of Anaheim
Trent Murphy (born 1990) – linebacker for the Washington Redskins
Brett Nicholas (born 1988) – catcher for the Texas Rangers
Bart Oates (born 1958) – center for the New York Giants and San Francisco 49ers
Larry Owens (born 1983) – player for the Iowa Energy
Jim Palmer (born 1945) – starting pitcher for the Baltimore Orioles and Baseball Hall of Famer
Danica Patrick (born 1982) – auto racing driver competing in the Indy Racing League and NASCAR
James Pazos (born 1991) – relief pitcher for the New York Yankees
Andrus Peat (born 1993) – offensive tackle for the New Orleans Saints
Rodney Peete (born 1966) – USC and NFL quarterback
Pat Perez (born 1976) – professional golfer
Scott Pinckney (born 1989) – professional golfer
Mike Pollak (born 1985) – guard for the Cincinnati Bengals
Don Pooley (born 1951) – professional golfer
Brock Purdy (born 1999) – NFL quarterback
Ted Purdy (born 1973) – professional golfer
Marilyn Ramenofsky (born 1946) – competitive swimmer, Olympic medalist
Brooks Reed (born 1987) – defensive end for the Atlanta Falcons
 Danny Schayes (born 1959) – college and NBA basketball player, son of Dolph Schayes
Chaz Schilens (born 1985) – wide receiver for the Saskatchewan Roughriders
Curt Schilling (born 1966) – professional baseball pitcher and broadcaster
Tyler Schmitt (born 1986) – NFL long snapper
Wes Schweitzer (born 1993) – offensive guard for the Atlanta Falcons
Lyle Sendlein (born 1984) – center for the Arizona Cardinals
Paul Silas (1943–2022) – NBA player and coach
Shelley Smith (born 1987) – guard for the Houston Texans
Eric Sogard (born 1986) – second baseman for the Oakland Athletics
Karsten Solheim (1911–2000) – creator and founder of PING
Sammy Solis (born 1988) – relief pitcher for the Washington Nationals
Ken Stabler (1945–2015) – four-time Pro Bowl NFL quarterback, primarily with the Oakland Raiders
Kerri Strug (born 1977) – gymnast; 1996 Olympic gold medalist
Marcus Thomas (born 1984) – NFL running back
Michael Thompson (born 1985) – professional golfer
Pat Tillman (1976–2004) – college and pro football player killed in Afghanistan
Tim Toone (born 1985) – wide receiver for the Atlanta Falcons
Howard Twitty (born 1949) – professional golfer
Bobby Wade (born 1981) – wide receiver for the Kansas City Chiefs
Neal Walk (1948–2015) – basketball player
Ken Westerfield (born 1947) – disc sports (frisbee) pioneer
Markus Wheaton (born 1991) – wide receiver for the Pittsburgh Steelers
Danny White – professional football player for the Dallas Cowboys
Tom Wilhelmsen (born 1983) – relief pitcher for the Seattle Mariners
Dot Wilkinson (born 1921) – Hall of Fame inductee for bowling and softball
Alan Williams (born 1993) – player for the Phoenix Suns
 Jeremy Wolf (born 1993) – American-Israeli baseball player on the Israel national baseball team
Darren Woodson (born 1969) – professional football player for the Dallas Cowboys
J. J. Yeley (born 1976) – NASCAR driver

Miscellaneous

Johnny Chan – professional poker player, 10–time World Series of Poker champion
Angel Delgadillo – founder of the Historic Route 66 Association of Arizona and retired barber
Ernest Garcia II – founder of DriveTime, major shareholder of Carvana
Grumpy Cat (2012–2019) – Internet celebrity cat
Rob Leatham – professional shooter, 24-time USPSA National champion
Jerry Meek, evangelist and land developer
Arte Moreno – billionaire businessman, owner of Los Angeles Angels
Kayla Mueller – activist
Aron Ra – president of the Atheist Alliance of America, host of the Ra-Men podcast
Rick Alan Ross – deprogrammer
Mark Shoen – billionaire businessman, vice president of U-Haul
María Urquides – educator, "Mother of Bilingual Education"

Fictional characters
Eleanor from The Good Place
Michelle Chang and Julia Chang, both from the Tekken fighting video game series
Helen Lorraine, owner of talking canine Martha, her brother Jake, and friends T.D. Kennelly and Alice Boxwood from the television series Martha Speaks
John Rambo from First Blood and Rambo movies; born in Bowie
Bella Swan from the Twilight saga

See also

 List of Arizona suffragists
Lists of Americans

References